NCIX (formerly known as Netlink Computer Inc) was an online computer hardware and software retailer based in Richmond, British Columbia, Canada, founded in 1996 by Steve Wu (伍啟儀). The company served as an incubator for Linus Tech Tips, which was originally conceived by NCIX while Linus Sebastian was working there.

Outlets
It had retail outlets in Vancouver, Burnaby, Coquitlam, Richmond and Langley, British Columbia, as well as Markham, Mississauga, Scarborough, Toronto and Ottawa, Ontario. At one point, NCIX had 3 shipping facilities, one in Richmond, British Columbia, another in Markham, Ontario, and one in City of Industry, California. By July 17, 2017, NCIX had closed the Mississauga, Toronto, and Ottawa retail locations. NCIX declared bankruptcy with the Supreme Court of British Columbia on December 1, 2017, and stopped processing orders.

Demise 
As one of the few surviving PC retail chains in Canada, the company "invested heavily in large walk-in retail outlets… all of which were expensive to run", rather than further online sales assets to compete more effectively against Amazon and Newegg. Furthermore, the company prioritized "sales of individual computer parts over complete systems" at a time when consumers and "millennial gamers with relatively high disposable incomes" opted for built systems from trusted brands while "the number of hobbyists who want to build their own hardware is dwindling".

In July 2017, NCIX closed all their Ontario retail outlets in Ottawa, Mississauga, and Toronto and shortly after its Markham headquarters office.

In November 2017, NCIX closed its Vancouver, Burnaby, and Coquitlam stores. Canada Computers then announced they had taken over the leases on these locations.

On November 30, 2017, the last retail store located in Lansdowne Mall, Richmond closed, with only their headquarters in Richmond left.

On December 1, 2017, NCIX filed for bankruptcy with the Supreme Court of British Columbia, under File Number 170816.

Server data breach 
On August 1, 2018, a Craigslist ad listed as “NCIX Database Servers - $8500 (Richmond BC)” was found by Travis Doering of Privacy Fly, indicating unerased servers and data from NCIX operations were available for sale containing user data dating back 15 years. Employee data, including social insurance numbers, was also leaked. The data was obtained from an abandoned warehouse where NCIX stored servers before their bankruptcy after the servers were sold to make up for the $150,000 rent fees owed to the owner of the warehouse. This prompted an investigation by the RCMP and Office of the Information and Privacy Commissioner of British Columbia, and the police seized the servers.  Despite this, the data on the servers had been copied and sold multiple times before the servers were seized.  Software engineer Kipling Warner since sued NCIX and their auctioneer for failing to properly protect the information.

References

External links 

 NCIX.ca (Canada) (archive)
 NCIX.com (U.S.) (archive)
 DirectCanada (Archive)

Online retailers of Canada
Defunct retail companies of Canada
Consumer electronics retailers of Canada
Companies based in Richmond, British Columbia
Defunct companies of British Columbia
Canadian companies established in 1996
Canadian companies disestablished in 2017
Retail companies established in 1996
Retail companies disestablished in 2017
1996 establishments in British Columbia
2017 disestablishments in British Columbia
Companies that have filed for bankruptcy in Canada